Baocheng is a town in southern Hainan, China, to the north of Sanya. It is the county seat of Baoting Li and Miao Autonomous County. The Baocheng River flows through the town. The area is home to the Baocheng people, who belong to the Qi people of the Li ethnic group.

Geography 
About 63,000 mu of the town's area is forested, and 15,727 mu is arable.

Administrative divisions 
Baocheng administers three residential communities and eight administrative villages.

Residential communities 
Baocheng administers the following three residential communities:

 Chengbei Community
 Chengnan Community
 Rezuo Community

Villages 
Baocheng administers the following eight administrative villages:

 Chaokang Village
 Fanwen Village
 Shihao Village
 Maojie Village
 Shipin Village
 Xipo VIllage
 Chuntian Village
 Shidong Village

Demographics 
As of 2020, the town's population is 37,492, comprising 13,128 households. Of this, 22,383 people (59.70%) are ethnically Li, and 1,430 (3.81%) are ethnically Miao.

References

Township-level divisions of Hainan
Populated places in Hainan
County seats in Hainan